The Kampenwand Cable Car is a cable car up to Kampenwand, near Aschau, in the German state of Bavaria. It was built in 1957. A ride to the  summit station takes approximately 14 minutes.

References

External links

 Kampenwand brochure 

Cable cars in Germany
1957 establishments in West Germany
Transport in Bavaria